Vitaliy Fedotov (born 16 July 1991) is a Ukrainian football midfielder.

Career
Fedotov was a member of different Ukrainian national youth football teams. He was also a member of the Ukraine under-20 football team last time and scored 1 goal in a match against the Kazakhstan national under-20 football team on 4 September 2010.

Career statistics

References

External links 

1991 births
Footballers from Donetsk
Living people
Ukrainian footballers
Ukrainian expatriate footballers
Ukraine youth international footballers
Ukraine under-21 international footballers
FC Shakhtar-3 Donetsk players
FC Mariupol players
FC Metalurh Donetsk players
FC Arsenal Tula players
Riga FC players
FC SKA-Khabarovsk players
FC Avangard Kursk players
Odra Opole players
Ukrainian Premier League players
Ukrainian Second League players
Russian Premier League players
I liga players
Association football midfielders
Expatriate footballers in Russia
Expatriate footballers in Poland
Expatriate footballers in Latvia
Ukrainian expatriate sportspeople in Russia
Ukrainian expatriate sportspeople in Poland
Ukrainian expatriate sportspeople in Latvia